Kiki Bertens was the defending champion, but lost in the third round to Maria Sakkari.

Madison Keys won the title, defeating Caroline Wozniacki in the final, 7–6(7–5), 6–3. This was the final WTA tour singles final Wozniacki participated in before her retirement in January 2020.

Seeds
The top eight seeds received a bye into the second round.

Draw

Finals

Top half

Section 1

Section 2

Bottom half

Section 3

Section 4

Qualifying

Seeds

Qualifiers

Lucky loser
  Conny Perrin

Draw

First qualifier

Second qualifier

Third qualifier

Fourth qualifier

Fifth qualifier

Sixth qualifier

Seventh qualifier

Eighth qualifier

References

External links
 Main Draw
 Qualifying Draw

Volvo Car Open - Singles
Charleston Open